"Casanova" is a song recorded by Mexican singer Paulina Rubio for her sixth album Border Girl (2002). It was written by Calanit Ledani, Darryl Zero, Jeeve and Kevin Colbert, whilst it was produced by Sal Gaustella and released as the album's third single on 9 December 2002. A Spanish version titled "Baila Casanova" was also released.

Music video
The video was directed by Colombian director Simón Brand, who in the same week, filmed the music video for the song "I'll Be Right Here (Sexual Lover)". The video was shot at the  National Palace of the Dominican Republic. ¡Hola!'''s staff wrote that in the video Rubio "appears spectacular a la Marilyn Monroe."

The video premiered in the month of October 2002 on Sol Música.

Usage in media
The song appeared in the 2003 American-Australian film Kangaroo Jack, and also appeared on the film's soundtrack released by Hip-O Records. It also appeared for 15 seconds on the trailer for the 2003 American teen comedy The Lizzie McGuire Movie''.

Charts

References

2003 singles
Paulina Rubio songs
Number-one singles in Spain
Spanish-language songs
Music videos directed by Simon Brand
2003 songs